Turkix  was a live Linux distribution, capable of self-installing on hard disk using a graphical wizard. The main goal of Turkix was to provide a very user-friendly Linux environment. Turkix was based on the Mandriva distribution. In visual style Turkix was similar to Windows XP.

First two releases of Turkix (1.0 and 1.9) were in Turkish and Azerbaijani only, but later releases had more language support, especially English.

Latest stable release of Turkix was 3.0, and the last unstable release was 10.0 Alpha. At this point the project was aborted.

Release history

References 
 

RPM-based Linux distributions
Turkish-language Linux distributions
Discontinued Linux distributions
Linux distributions